Kangaroo River may refer to:

 Kangaroo River (Clarence Valley), a watercourse with its source in the Clarence Valley LGA, New South Wales, Australia
 Kangaroo River (Shoalhaven), a tributary of the Shoalhaven River in the Southern Highlands region of New South Wales, Australia
 Kangaroo River (Queensland), a watercourse in Queensland, Australia

See also 
 Kangaroo (disambiguation)